Athletes from Germany (GER) have appeared in only 20 of the 22 editions of the Winter Olympic Games as they were not invited to two events after the World Wars, in 1924 and 1948. Germany hosted the 1936 Winter Olympics in Garmisch-Partenkirchen and had been selected to host in 1940 again.

The nation appeared 11 times as a single country (IOC code GER), before World War II and again after German reunification in 1990. Three times, from 1956 to 1964, German athletes from the separate states in West and East competed as a United Team of Germany, which is currently listed by the IOC as EUA, not GER.

Due to partition under occupation that resulted in three post-war German states, German athletes took part seven times for the contemporary states they lived in, in 1952, and from 1968 to 1988. The all-time results of German athletes are thus divided among the designations GER, EUA, FRG, GDR and also SAA (the Saarland only took part in the 1952 Summer games and won no medal).

Including the Winter Games of 2014, German athletes have won 377 medals : 136 gold, 135 silver and 106 bronze. The IOC currently splits these results among four codes, even though only the East German Democratic Republic (GDR) from 1968 to 1988 had sent a separate team to compete against the team of the German NOC that represented Germany (GER) since 1896.

Timeline of Germany at the Winter Olympics

1924 - 1948 

In the Paris Peace Conference, the outbreak of World War I was blamed on Germany and other Central Powers allies. These nations, even though having new republican governments by now, were not invited to the 1920 Summer Olympics. While all other banned nations except Germany were invited again for the 1924 Summer Olympics, held for the second time in Pierre de Coubertin's home town of Paris, and for the 1924 Winter Olympics, also held in France, the ban on Germany was not lifted until 1925. This was likely related to the ongoing French Occupation of the Ruhr and the Rheinland between 1923 and 1925. Thus Germany was not present in Chamonix for the first Winter Olympics.

Germany took part the first time in the 1928 Winter Olympics in St. Moritz, with rather modest results, scoring only a Bronze medal in bobsleigh. Germany doubled the low score in the 1932 Winter Olympics held in Lake Placid, United States. Both 1932 games, held during the worldwide Great Depression, suffered from low European participation due to high cost of travel overseas.

Already in spring of 1931 it had been decided that the 1936 Summer Olympics were to be held in Berlin. Germany should host the 1936 Winter Olympics, too. From 1933 onwards, Germany became known as Nazi Germany, the change being marked also by the use of the Nazi party flag. To host the winter event, two Bavarian towns were merged to form Garmisch-Partenkirchen. Alpine skiing made its first appearance as the combined, which added the results of both the downhill and slalom which were not separate contests yet. German athletes won Gold and Silver in both the men's and women's combined, for a 2nd rank overall.

The 1940 Winter Olympics were to be held in Sapporo, but Japan withdrew in 1938 due to the Second Sino-Japanese War. In June 1939, Garmisch-Partenkirchen was selected again, but three months later World War II broke out and the 1940 Winter Games were cancelled in November 1939. The 1944 Winter Olympics did not take place either. For the 1948 Winter Olympics, with the war in recent memory, Germany (and Japan) was not invited as it had no recognized NOC anymore. The NOC had been, as other organizations, been dissolved by the Allies.

Separate German teams 1952 - 1988 

The 1952 Winter Olympics were held in Norway, which had been occupied in 1940 by Germans. 
Public discussions in Norway were rather lively on the subject of whether or not Germans should be admitted to the Winter Games. Following the annual meeting of the IOC in Vienna in May 1951, invitations were extended to the German Olympic Committee, placed in the Federal Republic of Germany. On the whole, the press approved of
this decision, and the reaction of the Norwegian public seemed to prove that the decision was based on a correct estimate of the public opinion.

The IOC had not recognized the East German NOC, and asked the GDR to send athletes to the German NOC team, which was rejected by the GDR officials. The Saarland, having a recognized NOC but barely any winter sports tradition, did not participate in the Winter Games, but in the 1952 Summer Games, before joining West Germany later on. Thus Germans from West Germany took part in the 1952 Winter Olympics in 21 of 22 events, winning two Gold medals in bobsleigh, and one in figure skating. The IOC presently attributes the 2 Gold medals won by Bavarian bobsledder Andreas Ostler to "Federal Republic of Germany (1950-1990, "GER" since) FRG" for a 5th rank, while all other medals are attributed to "Germany GER" for a sixth rank. The figure skating couple Ria Falk/Paul Falk won Gold. Skier Annemarie Buchner aka Mirl Buchner won a medal in each of the three events she took part. Skier Rosa Reichert took another silver medal.

During the Oslo IOC meetings, several important matters were discussed, such as East German participation in Olympic Games. In Olympic Games in 1956, 1960 and 1964, German athletes of both states competed together as United Team of Germany (GER then, currently designated EUA). The 1968 games saw two separate German teams which still used the compromise common symbols.

The two states sent independent teams, incl. separate national symbols, designated as East Germany (GDR) and West Germany (GER 1968-1976, FRG 1980-1988) after that for five Games between 1972 and 1988 until the separate East German state ceased to exist in 1990.

1992-
After the German reunification in 1990 country returned under the IOC code GER and topped Olympic medal tables in 1992, 1998, 2002 and 2006.

Overview of Olympic participation

All German NOCs at the Winter Olympics

Combined medals at the Winter Olympics (including all German NOCs) 
status after the 2022 Olympics, as of February 20, 2022

Medals by sport (GER 1928–1936, 1952, 1992–current)
These totals include the one gold and one silver medal won by Germany in figure skating at the 1908 Summer Olympics.

Medals by sport (EUA 1956–1964)

Medals by sport (GDR 1968–1988)

Medals by sport (FRG 1968–1988)

Medalists

Alpine skiing

Cross-country skiing

Figure skating

Freestyle skiing

Ice hockey

Nordic combined

Skeleton

Ski jumping

Snowboarding

References

 

 
+Winter